Melvisharam is a town and suburb of Vellore city in the Indian state of Tamil Nadu. It is 7 kilometres from Ranipet, 5 km from historic town of Arcot and 17 km from Vellore city.

The Municipality of Melvisharam was constituted in the year 1951 as 1st Grade Town Panchayat and was subsequently upgraded as IIIrd Grade Municipality from 1.10.2005 The town has 21 Municipal wards. As of 2011, the town had a population of 44,786.

The seasonal river Palar flows on the north side of the town.

Topography 

Almost whole of the Melvisharam consists of flat terrain. The general slope is towards south east and the small streams that rise in Vellore hills situated in the west eventually fall into Palar river. The topography of Melvisharam town in plain and is situated at an altitude of 175.86 metres above mean sea level. The wind direction is predominant towards south west in the whole of the year. However, during summer it is from south west to north east.

Climate 

The taluk has fairly healthy climate. The study area has distinctly high temperature in hot months and cold weather is for a short duration.

The climatic seasons are generally classified as follows:

 Cold season from November to January with a mean maximum and minimum temperature of 29 C and 18.4 C respectively.
 Warm season from February to March and from July to October with a mean maximum and minimum temperature of 35 C and 19 C respectively.
 Hot season from April to June with a mean maximum and minimum temperature of 38.5 C and 24 C respectively.

The main maximum temperature during summer normal occurs in the month of May and June while the minimum temperature in winter occurs in January.

The north –east monsoon gives most of the rains.  The average rainfall for a year is found to be 996.76 mm. The maximum rainfall occurs during the month of September and October due to north-east monsoon.

Economy
The leather industries dominate the economy of Melvisharam. Its part of Ranipet Urban Agglomeration which is known for large manufacturing of leather products. Companies like K.H. Group, A.H. Group & T.M.A.R mainly dominate the economy.

Demographics

According to 2011 census, Melvisharam had a population of 44,786 with a sex-ratio of 977 females for every 1,000 males, much above the national average of 929. A total of 5,508 were under the age of six, constituting 2,874 males and 2,634 females. Scheduled Castes and Scheduled Tribes accounted for 8.99% and .03% of the population respectively. The average literacy of the town was 73.23%, compared to the national average of 72.99%. The town had a total of : 8906 households. There were a total of 15,753 workers, comprising 50 cultivators, 114 main agricultural labourers, 3,299 in house hold industries, 10,830 other workers, 1,460 marginal workers, 16 marginal cultivators, 37 marginal agricultural labourers, 235 marginal workers in household industries and 1,172 other marginal workers. As per the religious census of 2011, Melvisharam (M) had 76.12% Muslims, 22.97% Hindus, 0.77% Christians, 0.0% Sikhs, 0.0% Buddhists, 0.0% Jains, 0.12% following other religions and 0.0% following no religion or did not indicate any religious preference. According to the Survey taken by the Locals. The town has around 60,000 of the population in 2019.

The Muslim population of the town is dominated by Urdu Muslims who are mainly engaged in leather industry

Politics
S.T. Ameen is the sitting Chairman, R.Gandhi is the sitting MLA and Jagatrakshagan is sitting Member of Parliament from Dravida Munnetra Kazhagam (DMK).Melvisharam consists of more than 50 leather tanning and manufacturing industries

Melvisharam is part of Ranipet Assembly Constituency. Ranipet assembly constituency is part of Arakkonam (Lok Sabha constituency).

Politics Social Service
A.Abdul Matheen MBA Dist Secretry IMMK Ranipet Dist &
Founder Islamic Youth Welfare Association Melvisharam

Educational Institutions

 C. Abdul Hakeem College of Engineering & Technology
 Global Institute of Engineering & Technology
 C. Abdul Hakeem College (arts and science for men)
 M.M.E.S Women's Arts and Science College
 Islamiah Higher Secondary School (for boys and girls separately)
 K.H. Matriculation Higher Secondary School (boys and girls)
 Islamiah Primary School (for boys and girls separately)
 A.M.I Muslim middle school
 Khair-e-Jariya primary school
 Hakeem Matriculation School
 Crescent Nursery School
 Citizen Nursery School
 Seeyami Nursery & Primary School
 Dar Al Arqam School
 Leefling Kindergarten School 
 Government Hindu Higher Secondary School Kilvisharam 
 Government primary school Kilvisharam 
Arabic Colleges:
 Madrasa -e- Miftahul Uloom
 Madrasa -e- Manbul Hasanath
 Madrasa -e- Mazharul Huda

Arabic School:
 Madrasa -E- Niswan (Women)
 Madarsa - E - Khaleelullah (Women)
 Madarsa -E- Ashraful Makatib
 Madrasa -E- Imdadiya 

Deeniyat Institute:
 Makatib - E - Yaqoob.

Social activity:
 Islamic Youth Welfare Association Melvisharam

References

External links
 

Vellore
Cities and towns in Vellore district